Neonectes is a genus of beetles in the family Dytiscidae, containing three species found in the Palaerctic, including China, Japan, the Korean Peninsula, and Russia:
 Neonectes babai Satô, 1990
 Neonectes jakovlevi (Zaitzev, 1905)
 Neonectes natrix (Sharp, 1884)

References

Dytiscidae genera